The 2016 PGA Tour Canada, titled as the 2016 Mackenzie Tour – PGA Tour Canada for sponsorship reasons, ran from May 26 to September 18 and consisted of 12 official golf tournaments. This was the 47th season of PGA Tour Canada (previously known as the Canadian Professional Golf Tour), and the fourth under the "PGA Tour Canada" name. It was also the second under the "Mackenzie Tour - PGA Tour Canada" name after Mackenzie Investments signed a six-year sponsorship deal. Ten events returned from the 2015 schedule and two were added.

The purse for most events was $175,000 with first place earning $31,500. The final event of the season, the Freedom 55 Financial Championship, had a purse of $200,000, with $36,000 going to the winner.

Schedule
The following table lists official events during the 2016 season.

Unofficial events
The following events were sanctioned by the PGA Tour Canada, but did not carry official money, nor were wins official.

Order of Merit
The Order of Merit was based on prize money won during the season, calculated in Canadian dollars. The top five players on the tour earned status to play on the 2017 Web.com Tour.

Notes

References

External links
PGA Tour Canada official site

PGA Tour Canada
PGA Tour Canada